Geovanni Francisco Camacho Paredes (born December 15, 1984 in Guayaquil, Ecuador) is a football goalkeeper who most recently played for Mantá.

Club career
He has also played for Macará.

See also
Football in Ecuador
List of football clubs in Ecuador

References

External links
Camacho's FEF Player Card

1984 births
Living people
Sportspeople from Guayaquil
Association football goalkeepers
Ecuadorian footballers
Ecuador international footballers
Barcelona S.C. footballers
C.S.D. Macará footballers
C.D. Olmedo footballers
C.D. Quevedo footballers
Manta F.C. footballers